Nevada (unlike the state of Nevada) is a city in Collin County, Texas, United States. The population was 822 at the 2010 census, and 1,314 in 2020. First settled in 1835 by John McMinn Stambaugh and named "McMinn Chapel", the area was settled by Granville Stinebaugh, who named it after the Nevada Territory. Nevada enjoyed some prosperity after becoming a stop on the St. Louis Southwestern Railway, and the town incorporated in 1889.

On 9 May 1927, a half-mile-wide F4 tornado ripped through Nevada, leaving 19 dead, 100 injured, and property damage exceeding $650,000. The town had a difficult recovery; citizens voted to unincorporate, and placed the restoration of the community in the hands of the Collin County authorities. However, the growing mechanisation involved in agriculture, along with the Great Depression, caused the town to fall into stagnation. The railroad later removed its tracks from the area.

Recent growth in Collin County during the last 25 years has moderately improved life in Nevada. The population has again reached the heights of 1927.

Geography

Demographics

As of the 2020 United States census, there were 1,314 people, 295 households, and 252 families residing in the city.

Education
The city is served by the Community Independent School District.

References

External links
 City of Nevada official website

Dallas–Fort Worth metroplex
Cities in Texas
Cities in Collin County, Texas
Populated places established in 1889